Lentua is a medium-sized lake of Finland and it is the 57th biggest lake in Finland. It belongs to Oulujoki main catchment area and it is situated in Kuhmo municipality in the Kainuu region. There is a route around the lake for paddlers.

See also
List of lakes in Finland

References

External links
 

Lakes of Kuhmo